Photography & Culture is a triannual peer-reviewed academic journal published by Routledge. It was started in 2008 by Berg Publishers and was published by Bloomsbury Publishing until 2015. The editors-in-chief are Kathy Kubicki (University for the Creative Arts), Thy Phu (University of Western Ontario), and Val Williams (University of the Arts London).

Abstracting and indexing 
The journal is abstracted and indexed in:

External links 
 

English-language journals
Arts journals
Triannual journals
Publications established in 2008
Taylor & Francis academic journals